The green-eared barbet (Psilopogon faiostrictus) is an Asian barbet.

Characteristics 

The green-eared barbet is 24.5–27 cm in length. It is a plump bird, with a short neck, large head and short tail. The adult has a white-streaked brown head and breast, green ear coverts, mainly dark bill,  and green-streaked yellow belly. The rest of the plumage is green. Both sexes and immature birds are similar. This species resembles lineated barbet, but is smaller, has the distinctive green ear patch, a darker bill and a dark, rather than yellow, eye-ring.

Distribution and habitat 

The green-eared barbet is a resident breeder in southern China, Cambodia, Laos, Thailand  and  Vietnam. It inhabits broadleaf evergreen and mixed or open woodlands at up to  elevation.

Behaviour and ecology 

It nests in a tree hole.

References

External links 

green-eared barbet
Birds of Indochina
green-eared barbet
Articles containing video clips